Friedrich Gärtner (11 January 1824 in Munich - 1905 ibid) was a German architectural painter.

Biography
He was born in Munich, the son of the architect Friedrich von Gärtner, with whom he went to Athens in 1840. After his return, he studied at the Academy and under Simonsen, of Copenhagen, then in Paris (1846) under Claudius Jacquand; visited Spain and Morocco in 1848, lived again in Paris, in 1851-57, and settled in Munich, where two of his paintings, “Interior of a Moorish House” and “Court of a Monastery by Moonlight” (1846), are in the New Pinakothek.

See also
 List of German painters

Notes

References
 
 

1824 births
1905 deaths
19th-century German painters
19th-century German male artists
German male painters
20th-century German painters
20th-century German male artists
Artists from Munich